Walsura is a genus of plants in the family Meliaceae.

Species
Species accepted by the Plants of the World Online as of February 2023: 

Walsura bonii 
Walsura candollei 
Walsura decipiens 
Walsura dehiscens 
Walsura gardneri 
Walsura monophylla 
Walsura oxycarpa 
Walsura pachycaulon 
Walsura pinnata 
Walsura poilanei 
Walsura robusta 
Walsura sarawakensis 
Walsura trichostemon 
Walsura trifoliolata 
Walsura tubulata 
Walsura villosa

Medicinal uses
Some Walsura species may be used for skin troubles and strengthening loose teeth.

References

External links

 
Meliaceae genera
Taxonomy articles created by Polbot